Peloropeodinae is a subfamily of flies in the family Dolichopodidae. In some classifications, the genera of the subfamily are included in Sympycninae. According to Germann et al. (2011), the subfamily is polyphyletic.

Genera 
Acropsilus Mik, 1878 (unplaced in Dolichopodidae)
Alishanimyia Bickel, 2007
Anepsiomyia Bezzi, 1902
Chrysotimus Loew, 1857
Cremmus Wei, 2006
Discopygiella Robinson, 1965
Fedtshenkomyia Stackelberg, 1927
Griphophanes Grootaert & Meuffels, 1998
Guzeriplia Negrobov, 1968 (possibly a synonym of Chrysotimus)
Hadromerella De Meijere, 1916
Meuffelsia Grichanov, 2008
Micromorphus Mik, 1878
Nanomyina Robinson, 1964
Neochrysotimus Yang, Saigusa & Masunaga, 2008
Nepalomyia Hollis, 1964
†Palaeomedeterus Meunier, 1895
Peloropeodes Wheeler, 1890
Pseudoxanthochlorus Negrobov, 1977
Vetimicrotes Dyte, 1980

The genus Notobothrus Parent, 1931 was formerly included in the subfamily, but was excluded from it and provisionally left incertae sedis within the family Dolichopodidae in 2020.

References 

 
Dolichopodidae subfamilies
Taxa named by Harold E. Robinson